The Seibu Princess Rabbits are an ice hockey team in the Women's Japan Ice Hockey League and All-Japan Women's Ice Hockey Championship. They are based in Nishitōkyō, a city in the western Tōkyō Metropolis, and play at the Higashi-Fushimi Ice Arena.

History 
The team was founded in 1974 as Kokudo Keikaku. It was one of the first women's ice hockey clubs to be created in Japan, establishing itself less than one year after Isetan, the officially recognized first women's team in Japan. Throughout the mid-1970s, Kokudo Keikaku regularly participated in self-organized matches against Isetan and the Mandai Memorial Club, the other women's teams in the region.

In 1978, an unofficial women's ice hockey national championship was independently created by a small number of teams from Hokkaido and the Tokyo Metropolis. Kokudo Keikaku was one of the founding members of the unofficial championship and participated in every tournament during 1978 to 1982. In 1982, the Japan Ice Hockey Federation sanctioned the tournament for the first time and it has been played as the official All-Japan Women's Ice Hockey Championship ever since.

For the following three decades, the All-Japan Championship was the only top level women's ice hockey tournament in Japan. In practice, this meant that Kokudo Keikaku played just three or four games of record during the three day tournament each season and generally played less than ten games total per season, including friendlies organized between other All-Japan Championship team or with teams outside of Japan. The team first claimed the title of Japanese Champion at the third All-Japan Championship, in 1984, and were contenders throughout the 1980s and early 1990s, winning six Championships during 1984 to 1993.

In 1993, the team was renamed as the Kokudo Ladies Ice Hockey Club. The name change inadvertently marked the beginning of a 15-year All-Japan Championship victory drought, which persisted through a second name change in 2006.

Kokudo Ladies were renamed as Seibu Princess Rabbits in 2006, when the Seibu Group became the team's primary sponsor. The new name was adapted as the women's counterpart to the Seibu Prince Rabbits, an Asia League team founded in 1972, which were named after Seibu Group and Seibu Group's principal holding, Prince Hotels.

Season-by-season results 
This is a list of all seasons completed by Seibu Princess Rabbits since the creation of the WJIHL in 2012.

Note: Finish = Rank at end of regular season; GP = Games played, W = Wins (3 points), OTW = Overtime wins (2 points), OTL = Overtime losses (1 point), L = Losses, GF = Goals for, GA = Goals against, Pts = Points, Top scorer: Points (Goals+Assists)

Players and personnel

2021–22 roster 

Coaching staff and team personnel
 Head coach: 
 Assistant coach: 
 Assistant coach: 
 Player-coach:  
 Player-coach: 
 Team manager:

Team honours

Japanese Championship 
All-Japan Women's Ice Hockey Championship

  Champions (12): 1984, 1986, 1987, 1989, 1990, 1993, 2008, 2009, 2010, 2012, 2016, 2018
  Runners-up (15): 1985, 1988, 1991, 1992, 1994, 1995, 2001, 2005, 2006, 2007, 2011, 2013, 2015, 2017, 2019
  Third Place (7): 1997, 1998, 1999, 2000, 2003, 2014, 2021

Women's Japan Ice Hockey League

  Champions (8): 2012–13, 2013–14, 2014–15, 2015–16, 2016–17, 2017–18, 2019–20
  Runners-up (1): 2020–21

References 

Women's ice hockey in Japan
Ice hockey teams in Japan
Seibu Princess Rabbits